Italy competed at the 1994 Winter Paralympics in Lillehammer, Norway. 24 competitors from Italy won 13 medals, 7 silver and 6 bronze, and finished 17th in the medal table.

See also 
 Italy at the Paralympics
 Italy at the 1994 Winter Olympics

References 

1994
1994 in Italian sport
Nations at the 1994 Winter Paralympics